Frederick Ladbrooke (1810–1865) was an English painter of landscapes and a member of the Norwich School of painters.

Life
Ladbrooke was born 26 November 1810, the son of Robert Ladbrooke and his wife Ann Dorey (née Bly), and was baptised at St John the Baptist's Church, Timberhill, Norwich on 2 December.

He was born into a family of artists, by whom he probably received his training. He was an exhibitor at the Norwich Society of Artists, specialising in depicting rural landscapes. He lived for most of his life in Bury St. Edmunds, Suffolk.

References

External links
Works by Frederick Ladbrooke in the Norfolk Museums Collections
Frederick Ladbrooke - Suffolk Artists website

Bibliography 

1810 births
1865 deaths
British landscape artists
Artists from Norwich
Artists from Bury St Edmunds